Maîtresse Françoise (pen name Annick Foucault) is a publicly known dominatrix in Paris, France. Her autobiography was published in France by publisher Éditions Gallimard.

Biography

Minitel 

Annick Foucault was born in the South of France. Her childhood was marred by the loss of her father. After having been the victim of an accident, she consecutively had no real other alternative but dropping out of university. Thus she chiefly became a self-taught woman. She first ran a ready-to-wear shop and then became interested in Minitel, which she considered to be "an excellent means of communication, a kind of no-man's-land where anything is allowed". She subsequently participated in various forums and set up a "debate forum", 3615 Fetish, which was devoted to sadomasochism, before launching in 1994 her own specialized "minitel network", under the name of Miss M. Marc Daum described her as "a major messaging authorizing officer 3615 on behalf of a foremost player in telematics, given that the good intellectual performance of her forums [had built] the loyalty of her knowledgeable readers". During the same period, she was the chief editor of a magazine—La Scène—with a circulation of 5,000 copies. In October 1996, she provided a "precious collaboration" to the journalist Monique Ayoun by the time she was writing an article dedicated to Minitel on behalf of the newspaper .

In parallel with these telematic experiences, her sadomasochistic practices have evolved:

Writer 

In 1994, Annick Foucault—who already enjoyed a strong reputation in specialized circles—published a writing under her real name: Françoise Maîtresse. The common thread unfolds over "her history, her childhood, the discovery of her cerebral sexuality, her experience as a dominatrix, in a style as precise as lively and literary". The script is prefaced by Pierre Bourgeade, who considered the literary quintessentiality of this essay as part of the expression of an "unconscious freedom of its own", while Jean-Jacques Pauvert displayed it as a "major work of erotic literature over the past ten years". In this autobiography, the author presented herself in two ways: Françoise, the dominatrix, and Marianne, "who discovered her masochism by watching the whip scenes in pirate movies as a teenager".  emphasized on the link which appeared to prevail between those two paradoxical idiosyncrasies: "Françoise, it is first of all the name of a little girl of twelve years old [...] who plays the mistress".

The book introduced sadomasochism into mainstream literature, "without censorship, but also without complacency towards the reader", by focusing on the "breaks" that lead to it, from an angle that, according to Annick Foucault, gains the consent from partners. Annick Foucault suggested that they be recognized as being endowed with "some weakness" and, further on, she commented the aforesaid point as follows: 

She pleads for the abandonment of some biases: 

Her intellection echoes the philosophical thought of Gilles Deleuze, to whom she pays tribute, in a way that, according to Charles J. Stivale, conveys a "perceptive and fascinating reflection on La Vénus à la fourrure, Présentation de Sacher-Masoch de Deleuze". According to Céline du Chéné, Mistress Françoise turns out to be "probably the most intellectual of the dominatrixes of the Parisian scene", owning "all the editions" of Leopold von Sacher-Masoch and "having maintained a correspondence" with Gilles Deleuze, who, as per Jean Pache, would have sealed "this unexpected disciple friendship and consideration".

After the publication of her story, which, as duly noted by Giovanni Firmian, was "a great success in France", she was invited to various French talk shows and gave interviews about sadomasochism.

On the occasion of the release of a translation of her book in Italy, Giovanni Firmian described her author as "the queen of dominatrixes and sadomasochistic practices, the most famous one in France, but also known throughout the rest of Europe and United States". However, the Italian periodical La Stampa reveals significantly more critical comments recorded by the journalist Mirella Serri, who believes that the author of Maîtresse Françoise considers herself to be the embodiment of "an outstanding artist belonging to a scarce and special breed: i.e. the "mystics" of sex".

Published works

Autobiographical account 

   , éditions Gallimard   réimpr. 2000 c/o La Musardine, 216 p., in coll. "Lectures amoureuses de Jean-Jacques Pauvert"  sous le titre Françoise maîtresse   . 

Foreign translation 

  Reprint in 1998,  235 p. c/o ed. "Círculo de Lectores" in coll.
 Barcelone : (in Spanish) Tusquets, 1996, 224 p. "La Sonrisa vertical"; Number 99. .
 Barcelone : (in Spanish) Círculo de Lectoras, 1998, 235 p. "La sonrisa vertical".

Digraphe

Miscellaneous

Marquis Magazine 

 « Laissez-nous ». "Leave us", ', Number 19 English and French version.
 « Pleine lune ». "full moon", Marquis Magazine, Number 21, English and French version.
 « Pleine lune », Marquis Magazine, Number 21, photos .
 « Interview JG-Leather », Marquis Magazine, Number 23, photos Christophe Mourthé.
 « Dominatrix Park - Les dernières amazones », Marquis Magazine, Number 31, photos Christophe Mourthé.

 Newlook 

 « Tu montes Maître ou je te monte ? », September 1994.
 « Agathe, tu ne jouiras point ! », Newlook, July 1994.

 Penthouse 

 « Ciré noir », Penthouse, 1995.

 Others 

 Préface à Retour à Roissy de Pauline Réage, dessins de Loïc Dubigeon, éditions Astarté, 1995. 48 p.
 « Mon premier esclave », De l'infini au zéro. Anthologie historique des lectures érotiques de Jean-Jacques Pauvert, Stock, 2001.
 « Petit cul », Mes lectures érotiques. Morceaux choisis de Jean-Jacques Pauvert, 2015.
  

 Perform 

 Drama 

 Les Bruits d'Avila, Sorbonne, texte de , mise en scène par Monique Kissel.
 Transfiguration, auteur : Philippe Guénin, le Théâtre Poème, Bruxelles, 1995, le Théâtre du Lavoir moderne, Paris, 1995.

 Radio interviews 

   Maîtresse Françoise est interviewée par Céline du Chéné. Émission préparée par Claire Martin du Gard et Pascale Dassibat. Réalisation de Laurent Paulré avec la collaboration de Jean-Baptiste Thoret, Philippe Rouyer, Céline du Chéné et Christophe Bier.
   Entretiens avec Arielle Dombasle, Maîtresse Françoise, La Bourette, Dominique Kalifa — avec la collaboration de JB Thoret, P. Rouyer, Céline du Chéné, Antoine Guillot, Jean Pierre Dionnet, Joseph Gohsn. Intervenants : Hélène Fillières & .

 Collaborations 

 1989 — TF1, Ciel mon mardi : Christophe Dechavanne, spécial SM.  
 1989 — La Cinq,  : Béatrice Schönberg.
 1990 — TF1, Ciel mon mardi : Christophe Dechavanne, spécial fétichisme.  
 1990 — La Cinq, Ça vous regarde :  et Jean Pierre Barbe.
 May 1993 — France 3, Français, si vous parliez : André Bercoff.
 June 1993 — A2, Durant la nuit : Guillaume Durand.
 Fébruary 1998 — TF1, Sans aucun doute : Julien Courbet. 
 2000 — Canal plus, Nulle part ailleurs : Philippe Gildas  à l'occasion de la sortie du film de Benoit Jacquot : Sade. 
 2001 — TF1, Ciel mon mardi : Christophe Dechavanne, spécial SM

 Critical bibliography 

 .
 
  .
 .
 .
  .
 Pierre Cormary, L'enfant qui criait au loup,'' Carnets de la philosophie N°7 - Le plaisir et rien d'autre

References

External links 
 

French memoirists
BDSM writers
French dominatrices
Year of birth missing (living people)
Living people
French women memoirists
Women erotica writers
French women novelists